The 2021–22 ECHL season was the 34th season of the ECHL. The regular season was scheduled to run from October 21, 2021, to April 17, 2022, with the Kelly Cup playoffs to follow. Twenty-seven teams in 20 states and two Canadian provinces were each scheduled to play 72 games. The Florida Everblades were the 2022 Kelly Cup champions when they defeated the Toledo Walleye in five games in the Kelly Cup championship.

League business

League changes
Following the delayed and COVID-19 pandemic affected season that led to 12 teams going on hiatus before starting the season, the league returned to its typical season start date in October with 27 teams participating. The league also returned to a two-conference, four-division alignment.

Team changes 
Eleven of the twelve teams that opted out of participating in the previous season returned: the Adirondack Thunder, Atlanta Gladiators, Cincinnati Cyclones, Idaho Steelheads, Kalamazoo Wings, Maine Mariners, Newfoundland Growlers, Norfolk Admirals, Reading Royals, Toledo Walleye, and Worcester Railers.
The Brampton Beast announced the team had ceased operations entirely on February 18, 2021, after originally opting out of the season.
The league added two expansion teams: the Iowa Heartlanders in Coralville, Iowa, and the Trois-Rivières Lions in Trois-Rivières, Quebec.

Affiliation changes

All-star game
During the 2019–20 season, the league had awarded the Jacksonville Icemen the 2021 All-Star Game, but the Jacksonville-hosted event was deferred to 2022. The All-Star Game returned to its previous format of an ECHL All-Star team playing against the host team. Additionally, there was a skills competition composed of fastest skater, hardest shot, and accuracy shooting events. Similar to the 2020 All-Star festivities, players from the Professional Women's Hockey Players Association (PWHPA) and the Premier Hockey Federation (PHF), formerly the National Women's Hockey League 2021, participated in both the skills events and as members of the All-Star team in the game. The selected players were the PWHPA's Sophia Shaver and Loren Gabel from the PWHPA and Allie Thunstrom and Jillian Dempsey from the PHF.

The All-Star Classic was held on January 17, 2022. The skills competition took place during the All-Star Game with the winner of each competition earning a goal toward their team's final score. Jacksonville earned all three points with Ben Hawerchuk winning the fastest skater, Croix Evingson winning the hardest shot, and Derek Lodermeier winning the accuracy shooting event. The ECHL All-Star team went on to defeat Jacksonville 14–7. The Kansas City Mavericks' Marcus Crawford was named the tournament's Most Valuable Player by scoring three goals and an assist.

Standings
Due to the imbalanced schedule and canceled games during the pandemic, teams are ranked on points percentage. 

Final standings

Eastern Conference

Western Conference

 - clinched playoff spot,  - clinched regular season division title,  - Brabham Cup (regular season) champion

Postseason

Playoffs format
The league announced its playoff format on January 21, 2022. At the end of the regular season, the top four teams in each division qualify for the 2022 Kelly Cup playoffs and are seeded one through four based on the highest points percentage earned in the season. Then the first two rounds of the playoffs are held within the division with the first seed facing the fourth seed and the second seed facing the third. The division champions then play each other in a conference championship. The Kelly Cup finals pit the Eastern Conference champion against the Western Conference champion.  All four rounds are a best-of-seven format.

Bracket

See also 
2021 in sports
2022 in sports

References

External links
ECHL website

 
2021–22
3
3